The Prevention of Genocide is a book by the sociologist Leo Kuper, about genocide. It is included on reading lists for related courses of study at several universities, and has been summarised in later texts on genocide, making it a notable work. According to Google Scholar, The Prevention of Genocide has been cited 186 times, as of December 2016.

References

Non-fiction books about genocide
Books about the Holocaust
Genocide prevention
Yale University Press books
1985 non-fiction books